Pollenia angustigena is a species of blow fly in the family Polleniidae.

References

Further reading

External links
 

Polleniidae
Articles created by Qbugbot
Insects described in 1940